Leonard James Browning (30 March 1928 – 27 September 2008) was an English footballer. He played as a striker for Leeds United and Sheffield United. Browning joined Leeds as an 18-year-old in 1946, and moved to Sheffield United in 1951. He scored more than 70 goals in a career that lasted only eight years. Browning was forced to retire in 1954 after developing tuberculosis. He died on 27 September 2008 of prostate cancer.

References
Profile at leeds-fans.org.uk
Obituary @ Yorkshire Post

1928 births
2008 deaths
Footballers from Doncaster
English footballers
Leeds United F.C. players
Sheffield United F.C. players
Deaths from prostate cancer
Deaths from cancer in England
Association football forwards